Kilrush Shamrocks are a Gaelic Athletic Association (GAA) club in Kilrush, County Clare, Ireland. They have won the Clare Senior Football championship 21 times, more than any other club in the county, the last title coming in 1987 when the Shamrocks beat Doonbeg.

History
Kilrush Shamrocks GAA club was founded in 1886 under the patronage of Revd. Dr. Dinan PP. Prior to 1900 the club was known as the "Shannon Sweepers". Competitive street leagues provided the basis for a first senior county championship title in 1902. The Shamrocks have gone on to record a total of 21 county titles. The 1930s, 1950s and early 1960s were very successful years for the club, with the club reaching its greatest heights in the 1970s. Throughout these years the local schools and numerous former stalwarts continued to foster and promote Gaelic football in the parish.

Captain Tubridy Memorial Park, affectionately known as "The Cricket Field" is located one mile south of Kilrush, on the road to the Killimer car ferry. In 2016, the construction of a stand was completed at the venue to accommodate spectators. The development of the stand was part of a decade-long series of upgrades which included the addition of floodlighting.

Major honours
 Munster Senior Club Football Championship Runners-Up: 1978, 1979, 1981
 Clare Senior Football Championship (21): 1902, 1903, 1912, 1924, 1930, 1931, 1934, 1937, 1938, 1951, 1957, 1958, 1960, 1962, 1975, 1976, 1977, 1978, 1979, 1981, 1987
 Clare Football League Div. 1 (Cusack Cup) (12): 1930, 1937, 1938, 1943, 1947, 1951, 1974, 1978, 1979, 1984, 1986, 2002
 Clare Intermediate Football Championship (4): 1937, 1952, 1955, 2018
 Clare Junior A Football Championship (3): 1944, 1951 (as Ballykett), 1954 (as Ballykett)
 Clare Under-21 A Football Championship (2): 1975, 1994

References

Gaelic games clubs in County Clare
Gaelic football clubs in County Clare
Kilrush